Larry Wayne Womble (June 6, 1941 – May 14, 2020) was a Democratic member of the North Carolina General Assembly representing the state's seventy-first House district, including constituents in Forsyth County.  A retired educator from Winston-Salem, North Carolina, Womble served nine terms in the state House. After sustaining injuries in a car crash, he announced in 2012 that he would not run for another term.

Womble was born in Winston-Salem, North Carolina to the late Owen Luchion and Dorothy Gwyn Womble and attended Forsyth County public schools. He earned a B.S. degree in Education at Winston-Salem State University in 1963, and then attended the University of North Carolina - Greensboro where he earned a Master of Education degree in Administration (and a Principal's Certificate) in 1977. He later earned an Ed.S. in Administration and an Advanced Principal's Certificate from Appalachian State University in 1979.

Womble launched his political career at the age of 40, with his election to the Winston-Salem Board of Aldermen. He served on the Board until 1993, and was elected to the North Carolina General Assembly in 1995.

He died at his home in Winston-Salem on May 14, 2020, aged 78, after a period of declining health.

Electoral history

2010

2008

2006

2004

2002

2000

References

|-

Democratic Party members of the North Carolina House of Representatives
1941 births
2020 deaths
Politicians from Winston-Salem, North Carolina
21st-century American politicians
Winston-Salem State University alumni
University of North Carolina at Greensboro alumni
Appalachian State University alumni
Educators from North Carolina
North Carolina city council members